Williams Riley was an American country music band composed of Steve Williams (lead vocals), Derek George (guitar, background vocals), Charlie Hutto (guitar, background vocals), Joe Rogers (steel guitar, fiddle, harmonica), Dave Guidry (bass guitar), Travis Thibodaux (keyboards, background vocals) and Nick Buda (drums). Derek George had formerly played guitar for Bryan White, and before that, he was a member of the band Pearl River. Williams Riley self-released its debut album in 2009 and has charted on the U.S. country charts with "Country Livin'." This album includes collaborations with White, as well as Slash and Edwin McCain. The band's self-titled debut album received a favorable review from Matt Bjorke of Roughstock, who called it a "well-crafted album of contemporary country music."

On June 21, 2010, the band's label, Golden Music announced it was shutting its Nashville division. George produced Randy Houser's 2013 album How Country Feels.

Discography

Albums

Singles

Music videos

References

External links
Official website

American country music groups
Musical groups established in 2009